Serratus Mountain is a jagged, ridge-like mountain between Mount Tantalus (North) and Lake Lovely Water (South). Like most other peaks in the Tantalus Range, it is composed of loose rock.  Most routes here are scrambles.  The mountain is a standard single-day destination from the Jim Haberl hut.

Climate

Based on the Köppen climate classification, Serratus Mountain is located in the marine west coast climate zone of western North America. Most weather fronts originate in the Pacific Ocean, and travel east toward the Coast Mountains where they are forced upward by the range (Orographic lift), causing them to drop their moisture in the form of rain or snowfall. As a result, the Coast Mountains experience high precipitation, especially during the winter months in the form of snowfall. Temperatures can drop below −20 °C with wind chill factors below −30 °C. The months July through September offer the most favorable weather for climbing Serratus.

Nearby
 Mount Tantalus
 Alpha Mountain
 Mount Dione
 Lake Lovely Water
 Jim Haberl hut

References

External links
 Weather: Mountain Forecast
 
 
 BC travel info for the Tantalus Range

Pacific Ranges
Sea-to-Sky Corridor
Two-thousanders of British Columbia
New Westminster Land District